John Woods Duke (July 30, 1899 – October 26, 1984) was an American composer and pianist born in Cumberland, Maryland. He is best known for his large output of art songs.

Biography 
John Woods Duke was the oldest child in a large musical family. After teaching him to read music at an early age and starting him on piano lessons at age 11, Duke's mother (a talented singer herself) enrolled him in the Cumberland, MD Allegheny Academy. By age 16 he had won a three-year scholarship to the Peabody Conservatory in Baltimore. 
	
While at Peabody, Duke studied composition and theory under Gustav Strube and piano with Harold Randolph (whose own tutors had included Hans von Bülow, Clara Schumann, and Franz Liszt). He graduated in 1918, and, in the midst of wartime, volunteered his services to the Student Army Training Corps at Columbia University. 
	
Duke stayed in New York City after the war. He debuted as a concert pianist in Aeolian Hall and wrote his first art song. Within a few years he began playing as a soloist with the New York Philharmonic. He married Dorothy Macon, with whom he had two children and who collaborated with him as a librettist on several art songs. 
	
In 1923, Duke accepted a position on the music faculty at Smith College in Northampton, MA. He gained a full professorship at Smith in 1936, and remained at the institution until 1967 when he received the Peabody Alumni Association Award for Distinguished Service in the field of music following his retirement. His prodigious output of art songs continued, including such well-known pieces as "I've Dreamed of Sunsets" and "Lullabye". Pursuing compositional studies, Duke took a year's sabbatical in 1929 to work with Nadia Boulanger in Paris and Artur Schnabel in Berlin. Returning to the United States, he spent a summer at the Yaddo artists' colony in Saratoga Springs, NY.

Professor Duke's lectures, particularly those on his own work (which would eventually total approximately 260 art songs) became very popular. His pieces were later selected for inclusion in such classic anthologies as Music for the Voice by Sergius Kagen and The Singer's Repertoire by Berton Coffin.
	
Although Duke's work covered a wide range of styles, it showed the particular influence of 19th-century German Lieder. Like those who influenced him, Duke had a passion for setting poems in his native language to music. Though he himself trained in piano, John Duke wrote almost all of his compositions for voice. When asked why, the composer replied, "I think it is because of my belief that vocal utterance is the basis of music's mystery."

References

Further reading
 American Bass, Donald Gramm, notably sang John Duke's settings of Edwin Arlington Robinson narrative poems, Three Poems by Edwin Arlington Robinson: Richard Cory, Luke Havergal, Miniver Cheevy.
Compton, Earl Wilson. 1974. A Singer's Guide to the Songs of John Duke. Ann Arbor, MI: University Microfilms.
 PBS.org

1899 births
1984 deaths
American male classical composers
American classical composers
20th-century classical composers
People from Cumberland, Maryland
Musicians from Maryland
Peabody Institute alumni
Smith College faculty
20th-century American pianists
20th-century American composers
American male pianists
20th-century American male musicians